David Howe Turner is a professor of Anthropology at the University of Toronto, and a Fellow at Trinity College and the Netherlands Institute for Advanced Study. He has worked with Indigenous Australians since 1969 and has worked with indigenous peoples in Bali, North India, Japan, and Canada. At Toronto, his main area of focus is comparative religion and the role of music in the indigenous societies of Australia, North America, Africa, and India.

While conducting his Ph.D at the University of Western Australia, Turner began his fieldwork with the people of Groote Eylandt, in order to better understand Aboriginal social organization and symbolism. Since then, he has challenged common notions of hunter-gatherer social and spiritual life and sought to bring a deeper understanding of the Australian Aboriginal way of life to the modern world. Indeed, in 1986, after undergoing the second stage of initiation by the Aboriginal people of Groote Eylandt, he was told by his hosts to go back out into the modern world and show its people another way of life, so that they might live more harmoniously with others. Turner was encouraged to become a missionary of sorts, a representative of the Aboriginal world.

Turner's view of indigenous Australian society
The indigenous Australians, far from being a primitive people, have a highly sophisticated society and worldview which, in Turner's view, is in many ways more advanced than those of modern Western civilization. According to Turner, the Aborigines have developed several social mechanisms for ensuring social and environmental harmony that run contrary to conventional Western thinking. In particular, rather than formulate their society around notions of personal or national autonomy and property, they favour a philosophy of mutual dependence. It is this mutual dependence, or interdependence, which ensures peaceful coexistence.

This is explicit in the Aboriginal practice of renunciation, which resembles reciprocal altruism but runs much deeper. Rather than reciprocal trading of resources, or sharing them by giving a portion of what one has to another, the Aborigines give everything of what they have to whoever needs it, as codified by the statement: "You have nothing, everything I have is yours; I have nothing, everything you have is mine."

Likewise, Turner notes that the Aborigines practice renunciation in their allocation of property. On Bickerton Island, each group of people within Aboriginal society lives within a defined region of land, and each region contains one major resource (such as fresh water or a particular type of food). Rather than having exclusive access to their region's resource (as in conventional concepts of ownership), the group is instead forbidden to consume it. In the Aboriginal world, such resources exist only to be given freely to members of neighbouring groups. Again, this is a method which makes self-sufficiency impossible, ensuring that neighbours must rely on each other and work to make their relations cooperative and peaceful.

Turner's view is that renunciation is not simply a concept or an economic theory, but a literal reenactment of creation as it is perceived by the Aborigines. For the Aborigines, physical and spiritual reality coexist, flowing in and out of each other in an endless process. Spiritual forms are always giving of themselves to make the world and the people in it. In such a world, it makes no sense to hold on to anything, because nothing is ever "yours" to begin with. So, an act of renunciation—even something as simple as giving food to a stranger who does not have any is an action which reflects the fundamental nature of reality itself.

In Turner's view, rather than simply failing to develop modern technologies, economics, and ways of living, at some point in their history (upwards of 130,000 years), the Aborigines made a conscious decision to turn toward more socially and spiritually meaningful pursuits. They turned away from technology, and toward each other. In doing so they eliminated poverty, theft, social class, and warfare, and lived in peace for possibly tens of thousands of years.

Books
 Turner, David H. 1974. Tradition and transformation: a study of the Groote Eylandt area aborigines of northern Australia. Australian aboriginal studies, no. 53. Canberra: Australian Institute of Aboriginal Studies.
 Turner, David H. 1977. The concept of kinship: some qualifications based on a re-examination of the Australian data. Leiden, Netherlands: Koninklijk Instituut voor Taal-, Land- en Volkenkunde.
 Turner, David H. 1977. Ideologues of band society: Nambir̄ir̄ma and Wee-sa-kay-jac. Toronto: Victoria University.
 Turner, David H., and Paul Wertman. 1977 Shamattawa: The Structure of Social Relations in a Northern Algonkian Band. Ottawa: National Museums of Canada.
 Turner, David H. 1978. Dialectics in tradition: myth and social structure in two hunter-gatherer societies. London: Royal Anthropological Institute of Great Britain and Ireland.
 Turner, David H., and Gavin A. Smith. 1979. Challenging anthropology: a critical introduction to social and cultural anthropology. Toronto: McGraw-Hill Ryerson. (with G. Smith).
 Turner, David H. 1980. Leiden anthropology and the reinterpretation of Australian Aboriginal social organization. Leiden, Netherlands: Koninklijk Institut voor Taal-, Land- en Volkenkunde.
 Turner, David H. 1981. Australian aboriginal social organization. Atlantic Highlands, N.J.: Humanities Press.
 Turner, David H. 1985. Life before Genesis, a conclusion: an understanding of the significance of Australian Aboriginal culture. Toronto studies in religion, vol. 1. New York: Peter Lang.
 Turner, David H. 1996. Return to Eden: a journey through the aboriginal promised landscape of Amagalyuagba. Toronto studies in religion, vol. 21. New York: Peter Lang.
 Turner, David H. 1997. Afterlife before Genesis: an introduction : accessing the eternal through Australian Aboriginal music. Toronto studies in religion, vol. 22. New York: Peter Lang.
 Turner, David H. 1999. Genesis regained: Aboriginal forms of renunciation in Judeo-Christian scriptures and other major traditions. Toronto studies in religion, vol. 25. New York: Peter Lang.
 Turner, David H. 2002. The spirit lives: a personal journey from loss to understanding through religious experience. New York: Peter Lang.

References

Canadian anthropologists
Academic staff of the University of Toronto
Living people
Year of birth missing (living people)